St. Albert's Church is a former Roman Catholic parish church under the authority of the Roman Catholic Archdiocese of New York, located at 429-433 West 47th Street in Manhattan, New York City. The parish was established as the Belgian national parish in 1916 and is now closed.

References

Further reading
 
 
 

Closed churches in the Roman Catholic Archdiocese of New York
Closed churches in New York City
Roman Catholic churches in Manhattan
National parishes
Hell's Kitchen, Manhattan